Charlie George Wakefield (born 23 May 2000) is an English professional footballer who plays as a midfielder for Northern Premier League club Ilkeston Town.

Club career
Wakefield started his career in the academy of Chesterfield, and made his debut in the senior team on 17 April 2017, in a 3–1 loss to Scunthorpe United in EFL League One, a result that sealed the club's relegation to EFL League Two. He signed his first professional contract in the summer.

On 20 August 2018, Wakefield was loaned to Sheffield, in order to obtain some first-team experience. He was recalled by the club in October, with manager Martin Allen citing Wakefield's dropping to the bench following scoring a goal in the previous match against Worksop Town as reason for his return. In March 2020, he joined Matlock Town on a one-month loan deal. He left Chesterfield in the summer of 2020 after ten years with the club.

In October 2020, Wakefield joined Northern Premier League side Buxton.

He signed for Northern Premier League Division One Midlands side Ilkeston Town on a free transfer in August 2021.

Career statistics

References

2000 births
Living people
Footballers from Derby
English footballers
Association football midfielders
Chesterfield F.C. players
Sheffield F.C. players
Matlock Town F.C. players
Buxton F.C. players
Ilkeston Town F.C. players
English Football League players
National League (English football) players
Northern Premier League players